Jyoti Jyoti Mahajyoti is a 1988 Nepali novel by Daulat Bikram Bista. It was published in 1988 by Nepal Rajakiya Pragya Prakashan (Royal Nepal Academy). The book received the Madan Puraskar in the same year. It is the seventh novel of the author.

Synopsis 
It is a social realist novel that depicts story, pain, lifestyle, lifestyle etc. of the people in and around Pashupati region. It seeks to eradicate social inequality, anomalies, superstitions, customs and superstitions in the name of religion.

Reception 
The book received the prestigious Madan Puraskar for 2045 BS (1988).

See also 

 Madhabi
 Shirishko Phool
 Alikhit

References 

20th-century Nepalese books
20th-century Nepalese novels
Nepali-language novels
Nepalese novels
1988 Nepalese novels
Madan Puraskar-winning works
Novels set in Nepal
Novels set in Kathmandu